Jazz & Romantic Places is an album by American jazz saxophonist and bandleader Dave Pell, released on the Atlantic label in 1955.

Reception

Scott Yanow of Allmusic calls the album "a very enjoyable LP that has been out of print for decades and it may be somewhat challenging to locate".

Track listing 
 "How Are Things in Glocca Morra? (Yip Harburg, Burton Lane) - 2:57
 "On a Slow Boat to China" (Frank Loesser) - 3:54
 "Memphis in June"  (Hoagy Carmichael, Paul Francis Webster) - 2:55
 "Paris in the Spring" (Mack Gordon, Harry Revel) - 2:54
 "London in July" (Vernon Duke, Sammy Cahn) - 4:26
 "Isle of Capri" (Wilhelm Grosz, Jimmy Kennedy) - 2:33
 "The White Cliffs of Dover" (Nat Burton, Walter Kent) - 2:55
 "Sunday in Savannah"  (Hugh Mackay) - 3:20
 "Deep in the Heart of Texas" (June Hershey, Don Swander) - 4:06
 "Shuffle Off to Buffalo" (Al Dubin, Harry Warren) - 3:39
 "New Orleans" (Hoagy Carmichael) - 3:25
 "Flying Down to Rio" (Edward Eliscu, Gus Kahn, Vincent Youmans) - 2:47

Personnel 
Dave Pell - tenor saxophone
Don Fagerquist - trumpet
Ray Sims - trombone
Bob Gordon - baritone saxophone, bass clarinet
Donn Trenner - piano, celeste
Tony Rizzi - guitar
Buddy Clark - bass
Bill Richmond - drums
Shorty Rogers - musical director
John Palladino - recording engineer

References 

Dave Pell albums
1955 albums
Atlantic Records albums